Irony Is a Dead Scene is the third EP by American mathcore band, The Dillinger Escape Plan. It was recorded with Mike Patton and released on August 27, 2002, through Epitaph Records.

Background
Following the departure of the band's original vocalist Dimitri Minakakis, the temporary plan to record with Patton was in place before a permanent replacement vocalist had been found, yet by the time Patton had recorded vocals and the EP was released, the band had been touring with new vocalist Greg Puciato for nearly a year.

Reception

Irony Is a Dead Scene was generally reviewed well, and Patton's contributions to the band's sound was considered a successful experiment. Bradley Torreano of AllMusic gave the album 4 out of 5 stars, saying, "Despite the ridiculously high expectations from both artists' fan bases, Irony Is a Dead Scene is a brilliant collaboration between the two."

Track listing

Personnel
The Dillinger Escape Plan
 Liam Wilson – bass
 Adam Doll – keyboards, sampling
 Chris Pennie – drums, keyboards
 Ben Weinman – lead guitar, keyboards
 Brian Benoit – rhythm guitar
Guest musicians
 Mike Patton – lead vocals, samples, keyboards
Production
Produced by Ben Weinman and Chris Pennie
Engineered by Chris Badami
Mastered by Alan Douches
Mixed by Steve Evetts

References

The Dillinger Escape Plan albums
2002 EPs
Epitaph Records EPs